Iosif Vulcan (March 31, 1841 – September 8, 1907) was an ethnic Romanian Austro-Hungarian magazine editor, poet, playwright, novelist and cultural figure. He founded the literary magazine Familia, which he published for four decades.

Biography

Early life

Vulcan was born in Pusztahollód, Bihar County, in the Kingdom of Hungary, now Holod, Bihor County, Romania. His father Nicolae was the local Greek-Catholic parish priest from 1831 to 1844. Nicolae was a nephew of Bishop Samuil Vulcan and was born in Șinca Veche to a family originating in Wallachia. His mother Victoria (Viktória) Irinyi came from an old family of Romanian origins called Irimie before its name was Magyarized. The daughter of a schoolmaster from Létavértes (Leta Mare), her brother was János Irinyi. Vulcan's parents had six children, five of whom died early. His father was transferred to the Létavértes parish in 1844 before being named canon in Oradea (Nagyvárad) in 1879. Vulcan was attached to his parents as well as to Létavértes, where his mother is buried. He attended primary school there from 1847 to 1851, returning for his high school and university vacations. In later years, he came back for leisure as his busy schedule permitted.

He attended the Premonstratensian high school in Oradea from 1851 to 1859, followed by a law degree from the University of Pest. In 1853, while in high school,  he helped start a magazine that appeared until 1870. There are poems of his written in Pest in 1859, when he was eighteen. He became involved with Gura Satului ("The Voice of the Village") in Pest in 1861 and thereafter with Concordia and Aurora Română. Vulcan often spent time in Létavértes during his student days, writing his first love poems there, about a sweetheart who lived in the town.

Familia and later activity

He launched Familia literary magazine in Pest-Buda in 1865 and would lead it for some forty years. In 1866, he published his first volume of poetry. The same year, "De-aș avea" ("If I Had"), a poem that marked the proper literary debut of sixteen-year-old Mihai Eminovici, appeared in Familia. Vulcan received it with enthusiasm, publishing him under the more Romanian-sounding name Mihai Eminescu. A good part of the latter's work would continue to appear in Vulcan's magazine until 1883. In 1867, Vulcan visited France, a bold act for a resident of Austria-Hungary, which encouraged close ties with Germany instead. In 1868, he visited Romania. In 1869, in addition to a volume of short stories, he published a biography of Prince Carol, as well as an anthology of writings by Andrei Mureșanu, Ion Heliade Rădulescu, Timotei Cipariu, August Treboniu Laurian, Mihail Kogălniceanu, George Bariţ and Vasile Alecsandri. He showed a sincere admiration for Romania and its prince. In 1870, in Pest, he helped launch an appeal for funds to set up a Romanian-language theatre. Iosif Hodoşiu was the first head of the cultural society behind the appeal, with Vulcan presiding from 1895 to 1907.

In addition to his work in Romanian, Vulcan published Hungarian-language translations of Romanian poets in various magazines. In 1871, he was elected as an external member of the Kisfaludy Society, giving his first speech on the topic of Romanian poetry. He married Aurelia Popovici in 1871; the couple led a happy life together and she inspired a number of his poems. The daughter of a lawyer and landowner from Comlăuș, she lived until 1928. In 1877, he collaborated on a Hungarian-language anthology of Romanian folk poetry, contributing twelve ballads, sixteen romances and a preface on the general subject. Over the course of the 1870s, he continued publishing short stories, novels, travel accounts and a comedy play. He made periodic trips to Bucharest, where he developed connections, gathered material for his writing but also savored the cultural and national atmosphere he found in the Romanian capital. These visits increased starting in the early 1890s as his involvement there deepened.

In 1879, he was elected corresponding member of the Romanian Academy. In 1880, he moved to Oradea, taking Familia to a new headquarters. Lira mea ("My Lyre"), a work of erotic and patriotic poems, came out in 1882. In 1891, he became a titular member of the Romanian Academy, giving his introductory speech on Dimitrie Țichindeal. Nicolae Iorga commented that of the members from outside Romania, Vulcan was the most regular attendee. Indeed, from 1891 until shortly before his death, he was present at every regular session, taking part in the Academy's activities and rigorously carrying out the assignments he received. During the 1890s, encouraged by the reception of his first play, he published a number of other comedies. Against the backdrop of the Transylvanian Memorandum trial and rising national sentiment, he wrote a historical tragedy about the young Stephen III of Moldavia; this premiered at the National Theatre Bucharest in October 1892. He gave frequent speeches at meetings of ASTRA and at other cultural events throughout Transylvania. He died in 1907 of acute nephritis. Bishop Demetriu Radu officiated the funeral service, with speeches given by numerous Romanian and Hungarian cultural associations. He was buried in the Olosig cemetery in Oradea. Taking account of Bogdan Petriceicu Hasdeu's death one day earlier, critic Ilarie Chendi commented: "A day after Hasdeu, a much smaller flame was extinguished: the life of the elderly Iosif Vulcan. The late academician did not have the character of a great man, or of a fighter, or of an erudite personage, but few achieved more beautiful results than he did through perseverance and love of his work."

Appraisal and legacy

According to literary critic Cornelia Ștefănescu, Vulcan can be seen primarily as an enthusiast, a man who wrote for various magazines in Transylvania and several in Pest, having written two by hand in his schooldays, before devoting his energies to Familia; who travelled widely and wrote about his experiences; who helped initiate societies before organizing their activities, crisscrossing Transylvania (including stops in Gherla, Deva, Șomcuta Mare, Năsăud and Oradea) while promoting Romanian culture. She observes that his writing lacks external stylization, "saccharine images, complaisant rhetoric or gratuitous elegies", instead drawing its essence from authentic, realist folk roots.

The Iosif Vulcan Memorial Museum is located in Oradea on a street that bears his name. Inaugurated in 1965 in the house that he inhabited from 1897 until 1907, it is furnished with objects that belonged to him. The same city hosts the Iosif Vulcan National College, a secondary school that used his name from 1920 to 1990 and again since 1999. Bistrița, Cluj-Napoca, Curtici, Salonta, Satu Mare, Săcueni, Timișoara and Valea lui Mihai also have streets named after him.

Notes

References
Lucian Drimba,
Iosif Vulcan. Editura Minerva, 1974
Iosif Vulcan: Publicistica: I. Editura Minerva, 1987
  Teodor Neș, "Figuri Bihorene: Iosif Vulcan, 1841-1907", in Familia, Nr. 2/1936, p. 3-17 (digitized by the Babeş-Bolyai University Transsylvanica Online Library)

1841 births
1907 deaths
People from Bihor County
Eötvös Loránd University alumni
Romanian Greek-Catholics
Romanian Austro-Hungarians
19th-century Romanian poets
Romanian male poets
19th-century Romanian novelists
Romanian male novelists
19th-century Romanian dramatists and playwrights
Male dramatists and playwrights
Romanian travel writers
Romanian anthologists
Romanian translators
Romanian magazine founders
Romanian magazine editors
Titular members of the Romanian Academy
Deaths from nephritis
20th-century translators
19th-century translators
19th-century male writers
20th-century Romanian male writers
Eastern Catholic poets